Courtney Okolo (born March 15, 1994) is an American track and field sprinter who usually competes in the 400 metres. She starred at Carrollton (Texas) Newman Smith High School where she won multiple individual state championships.

In college, she ran for the Texas Longhorns. She was fourth in the 400 m at the 2013 NCAA Outdoor Championships, and then the following year she completed an individual and relay double at the 2014 NCAA Outdoor Championships. She set a collegiate record in the 400 m that year when winning the Big 12 Outdoor Championships in 50.03 seconds. In April 2016, she broke her own collegiate record, running 49.71 seconds at the LSU Alumni Gold Meet. Okolo won consecutive titles in the women's 400 m and 4 × 400 m relay at the 2015 NCAA Indoor Championships. In 2016 Okolo won 400m and 4 x 400m relay titles in both the Indoor and 2016 NCAA Outdoor Championships. After the season ended, she was awarded the Bowerman Award. She also won the Honda Sports Award as the nation's best female track and field competitor in 2016.

Internationally she won both individual and relay events for the United States at the 2013 Pan American Junior Athletics Championships and the 2015 NACAC Championships in Athletics. More gold came in the 4 × 400 m relay at the 2016 IAAF World Indoor Championships and 2016 Olympic Games.

Personal records
200-meter dash – 22.93 (2015)
400-meter dash – 49.71 (2016)

International competitions

National titles
NCAA Division I Outdoor Championships
400 m: 2014, 2016
4 × 400 m relay: 2014, 2016
NCAA Division I Indoor Championships
 400 m: 2015, 2016
4 × 400 m relay: 2015, 2016

References

External links
 
 
 
 
 
 Women's 400m | World Indoor Championships Birmingham 2018 via World Athletics on YouTube

Living people
1994 births
People from Carrollton, Texas
Track and field athletes from Dallas
American female sprinters
American sportspeople of Nigerian descent
Athletes (track and field) at the 2016 Summer Olympics
Texas Longhorns women's track and field athletes
Olympic gold medalists for the United States in track and field
Medalists at the 2016 Summer Olympics
Athletes (track and field) at the 2019 Pan American Games
Pan American Games gold medalists for the United States
Pan American Games bronze medalists for the United States
Pan American Games medalists in athletics (track and field)
Pan American Games track and field athletes for the United States
World Athletics Championships athletes for the United States
World Athletics Championships medalists
World Athletics Championships winners
World Athletics Indoor Championships winners
USA Indoor Track and Field Championships winners
Medalists at the 2019 Pan American Games
Olympic female sprinters